The Prague Black Panthers (formerly the Prague Panthers) are an American football team based in Prague, Czech Republic.  The Prague Black Panthers are one of the most successful teams in Central Europe,  having been named the Champions of the Czech Republic 18 times (1994–1996, 1999–2003, 2007–2010 as the Panthers, and 2013–2018 as the Black Panthers). After years of dominance in the Czech League of American Football, the Black Panthers currently compete as members of the Austrian Football League (AFL).  Internationally the team has played in the European Football League (EFL) and the EFAF Cup and also in Central European Football League (CEFL).

Panther History
The Prague Panthers were founded in 1991. In 1992 the Prague Panthers merged with Prague Cocks to become a larger more unified organization. The Panther senior team has been playing in the Czech American Football Association ever since it started in 1994.

The Panthers have enjoyed much success since their inception, winning the first three Czech Championships in 1994,1995 and 1996. The year 1995 was big for the young Panther organization as they beat their crosstown rival, the Prague Lions, 52–22. The game was played in front of a crowd of 4,500 at Vikovice Stadium in the neutral city of Ostrava, and proved to be a huge win for the Panthers as they won their second straight Czech Championship.
The Panthers have enjoyed much success in recent years winning 12 Czech Championships. In 2009, the Prague Panthers defeated the Black Panthers de Thonon-les-Bains of France 35–12 to win the EFAF Cup. Panther running back, Stanislav Jantos, paved the way for the Panthers' first EFAF Cup victory, earning MVP honors. In 2010, the Prague Panthers joined the Austrian Football League for the first time, posting a 3–3 record in league play.

In late 2012, the Prague Black Hawks, a team whom defeated them in the 2011 and 2012 CLAF Championship Games, merged with the Panthers to form the Prague Black Pathers.

The Black Panther Team
The Prague Black Panthers organization consists of Senior as well as Junior teams, Flag teams and cheerleaders. Every year the organization continues to grow and gets increasingly more popular in the community.

Black Panther Success
Czech League
 Czech Republic Champions (1994–1996, 1999–2003, 2007–2010 as the Prague Panthers, 2013–2018 as the Prague Black Panthers)
 Czech Republic Runners-up (1997, 1998, 2004, 2005, 2011, 2012)

International
 European Football League
 Quarterfinals (1999, 2012)
 Preliminary round (2000, 2002, 2013)
 EFAF Cup
 Winners (2009)
 Semifinals (2008)
 Winners of German Bowl Ost (1994)
 Winners of Prague International Bowl (1998)

References

External links 
 

American football teams in Europe
Sport in Prague
1991 establishments in Czechoslovakia
American football teams established in 1991